Big Sugar is a band formed in Toronto in 1988 by Gordie Johnson, the band's lead singer, lead guitarist and main songwriter. Between 1996 and 2016, Big Sugar was among the top 80 best-selling Canadian artists in Canada and among the top 25 best-selling Canadian bands in Canada.

History
Big Sugar originally consisted of Johnson, bassist Terry Wilkins, and drummer Al Cross, though the three musicians had already played together for several years as a supporting band for Molly Johnson's jazz performances, and as an informal jam band with members of the Bourbon Tabernacle Choir. When Johnson returned to rock music with Infidels, he helped his former bandmates secure a record deal; the eponymous debut album was released in 1991 on Hypnotic Records.

Success
Wilkins left the band in 1993. Big Sugar recorded the album Five Hundred Pounds with the help of guest musicians, including harmonica and tenor saxophonist Kelly Hoppe, aka Mr. Chill. Hoppe and Johnson were longtime friends from the same home town; Hoppe had given Johnson his first gig as a guitarist. He brought a blues and old-school R'n'B influence into the band's sound and later added keyboards and Melodica. He became a regular member of the band in September 1994; bassist Garry Lowe joined the band that July.

Lowe had moved to Toronto in the mid-1970s from Kingston, Jamaica, became a bass player for touring reggae recording artists, and was a founding member of "Culture Shock", a popular Toronto reggae band. Johnson had long admired Lowe; his was the bass sound that Johnson had been looking for. Johnson told The Globe & Mail, "His bass sound became how I envisioned Big Sugar's sound--a blend of blues and rock anchored by his reggae groove." Johnson told Artsfile Ottawa of their unique musical language, "...so much of our connection was unspoken. We didn't work things through musically. If I played a little something, he would play a little something back. It was a very symbiotic relationship.".

In 1993, Big Sugar released the album Five Hundred Pounds, which had little publicity or radio airplay but sold 10,000 copies in Canada on the strength of their live shows. In 1995, Johnson also recorded an album under the name Don't Talk Dance, with Tyler Stewart of Barenaked Ladies and Chris Brown of the Bourbon Tabernacle Choir.

In 1995, Big Sugar released two EPs; Dear M.F.(which featured a cover version of Traffic's "Dear Mr. Fantasy") and Ride Like Hell. Drummer Stich Wynston, who had taken over from Al Cross, was replaced by Walter "Crash" Morgan.  During a show in Iowa, Morgan suffered a heart attack and died on stage. Tyler Stewart flew in to help finish the tour, followed by Tony Rabalao. Lowe's musical partner Tony 'Raffa' White was enlisted for recording and other live performances, becoming Johnson's favorite studio drummer and appearing on other Big Sugar albums. Former Odds member Paul Brennan subsequently joined as the band's new drummer, playing on one of their most commercially successful albums, 1996's Hemi-Vision. In May 1997, Brennan left the band; Al Cross returned in 1998.

A French version of Hemi-Vision's single " Up Baby" was  recorded, titled "Ouvres-Toi Bébé", for radio stations in Quebec. The song gained widespread airplay in the province, and for their next album, 1998's platinum-selling Heated, the band recorded a French version of each single they released; the French songs were collected on the 1999 EP Chauffe à bloc. Also that year, Johnson and Hoppe began to perform acoustic shows as a duo, nicknamed "Big Sugar Acoustic--Two Fools on Stools".

In 1999, Big Sugar added a new rhythm guitarist, Lloyd 'Mojah' Benn. In February that year they opened for The Rolling Stones at the Air Canada Centre, and in July, performed at Woodstock 1999.

In 2000, the band released a dub album, Extra Long Life, under the stage name Alkaline, which toured as an eight-piece band, complete with horn section. In 2001, Big Sugar released Brothers and Sisters, Are You Ready?; a complete track-for-track French version, Brothers and Sisters, Êtes Vous Ready?, was released the same year. The English album concluded with a blistering rendition of "O Canada" that became their signature version and was included on the 2017 Universal Music box set Canada 150: A Celebration of Music, released as part of the 150th anniversary of Canada.

Hit And Run: The Best Of Big Sugar
The two-CD compilation Hit & Run, that included a special edition, limited-run live concert performance disc, was released in 2003. The live performance disc, Run, is a recording of Big Sugar's last concert on December 31, 2003, at the Shaw Conference Centre in Edmonton.

Reunion
Big Sugar reunited at the Telus World Ski & Snowboard Festival in Whistler, B.C. on April 23, 2010, with tour dates through that summer. In June 2011, they released the album Revolution Per Minute, which included keyboard player and rapper DJ Friendlyness and drummer Stephane Beaudin. Revolution Per Minute was released on CD and vinyl, with the vinyl album containing Alkaline dub remixes and bonus songs, as well as the radio hit "Roads Ahead". In 2012, Big Sugar released Eliminate Ya! Live!, a double CD/DVD set that included a new single covering Al Tuck's "Eliminate Ya!".

Johnson moved to Austin, Texas where, in 2003, he had co-founded the band Grady with "Whipper" Chris Layton on drums and Big Ben Richardson on bass. Described as 'cowboy metal', Grady recordings included versions of Big Sugar songs. In 2012, the band went on a national tour with Reggae legend Willi Williams. Also in 2012, Johnson formed the duo Sit Down, Servant!! when he began playing triple neck steel guitar and Moog bass pedals, a change made necessary by surgery for Carpal tunnel syndrome. Sit Down, Servant!! toured the world, opening for Joe Satriani and George Thorogood. Kelly Hoppe formed Mr. Chill and The Witnesses, a roots music group.  Mojah and Garry Lowe formed the reggae band Truth and Rights Revue, releasing one album. Johnson also formed the group Snakes of Central Texas with Hunt Sales and Bobby "Rock" Landgraph.

In 2014, Big Sugar released the album Yard Style which contains unplugged versions of nine of their original songs, plus four previously unreleased songs. The entire album was recorded live off the floor with the large group of musicians, many on hand drums, sitting in a circle 'yard style'. This release was followed by a three-month national theatre tour with the ensemble of musicians from the studio recording, resulting in 10–12 musicians on stage nightly. In June 2014, Raffa died of cancer.

Their next studio album Calling All The Youth, was released in 2015 and distributed by eOne Records. The next two years were spent touring, including Big Sugar European tours, the North American acoustic tour, and summer festival dates. In 2015, Johnson's wife, Alex Johnson, who had been Big Sugar's manager since the '90s, joined the band on percussion and backing vocals.

In May 2017, Hoppe retired from touring and the band. DJ Friendlyness left to focus on his band, The Human Rights. Austin-based Rey Arteaga, master of Afro-Cuban Congas, joined Big Sugar, which had become a percussion-heavy, guitar-based band as it no longer had keyboards, harmonica or horns. On July 7, 2018, Garry Lowe died of cancer. Big Ben Richardson, Johnson's partner in Grady who played bass in Big Sugar briefly before Lowe joined the band, returned to the stage and Chris Colepaugh joined on drums.

On December 28, 2018, the date of Garry Lowe's birthday, Big Sugar played a tribute concert in Toronto of the Big Sugar song catalogue. Joining them were members of Barenaked Ladies, Bedouin Soundclash, Broken Social Scene, Sloan, Danko Jones, Dream Warriors, The Road Hammers, The Human Rights, I Mother Earth, The New Deal, Culture Shock, and Wide Mouth Mason, plus Tom Wilson, Isax Injah, Maestro Fresh Wes, Julian Taylor, Willi Williams, Errol Blackwood, Mojah Benn, Adrian Sheriff Miller, and Leroy Sibbles.

In 2018, Universal Music's ICON album series released a Big Sugar ICON album. In 2020, Universal released the new Big Sugar album Eternity Now. Recorded and mixed at the Johnsons' studio, 'The Sound Shack', it features Alex Lifeson of Rush playing guitar on the title track. With the world going into lockdown due to the COVID-19 pandemic, the release show and tour was cancelled and Johnson performed a record release show online, accompanied by the recorded bedtracks. He then performed a record release show for the Deluxe Anniversary Hemi-Vision 25th Anniversary album, this time re-recording all parts himself and performing guitar and vocals live along with Warren Haynes, Chris Robinson, Rich Robinson, Colin James and Jason McCoy. A rousing edition of "If I Had My Way" saw hundreds of fans videos edited into the performance. It was such a feat that the record release show had to be delayed a day as Johnson put it all together in his studio. During the lockdown, Johnson also produced a one-season weekly series on YouTube called "GJ in the SoundShack", in which he talked about songwriting, recording and the equipment he uses.

In 2021, Johnson launched the tour "One Man Big Sugar Show--The Acoustical Sounds of Gordie Johnson", which is an acoustic performance of his songbook.

Big Sugar has resumed touring in 2022 and welcomed Garry Lowe's son, bassist Ben Lowe, to the band. The new band also included drummer Joe Magistro (of The Black Crowes and The B-52's).

Awards and recognition

Gordie Johnson has earned numerous gold and platinum records with his band Big Sugar and as producer or musician with Govt Mule, Joel Plaskett, The Trews and Default.

Big Sugar received five Juno Award nominations: as Best New Group in 1995, Rock Album of the Year (Hemi-Vision) in 1997, Group of the Year in 1998, Best Video ("The Scene") in 2000 and, in 2002, Best Rock Album (Brothers and Sisters, Are You Ready?).

In 1995, Big Sugar won the Edison Award, one of the oldest music awards in the world.

In 1998, the SOCAN awarded Big Sugar the songwriting award for "The Scene".

In 2003, Gibson guitar released a special edition limited-run Gordie Johnson Signature Series SGJ guitar with a hardshell case and Hugo Boss neckstrap. In 2013, the Hard Rock Café Hotel & Casino in Vancouver created a Gordie Johnson display that featured the SGJ.

In 2007, the Canadian Organization of Campus Activities (COCA) inducted Big Sugar into its Hall of Fame.

In 2010, Gordie Johnson was inducted into the Canada South Blues Society Hall of Fame.

Johnson received nominations by the WCMA as Producer of the Year in 2012, and Engineer of the Year in 2013.

In 2017, the Canadian Independent Music Association awarded Big Sugar its Road Gold Award, which recognizes Canadian artists who have sold at least 25,000 tickets during their Canadian tour(s) over the course of any 12-month period.

Discography

Albums

Live albums
 Eliminate Ya! Live! – 2012
 El Seven Nite Club Featuring Big Sugar - 1993

DVDs
 Eliminate Ya! Live! – 2012

EPs
 Dear M.F. – 1995
 Ride Like Hell – 1995
 Chauffe à bloc – 1999

Compilations
 Hit & Run - 2003

As AlKaline
 Extra Long Life – 2000

Singles

See also

 Canadian rock
 Music of Canada

References
Citations

External links
 
 CanConRox biography
 

Musical groups established in 1988
Musical groups from Toronto
Canadian blues rock musical groups
1988 establishments in Ontario
Reggae rock groups